The cuneus (plural cunei) is a smaller lobe in the occipital lobe of the brain. The cuneus is bounded anteriorly by the parieto-occipital sulcus and inferiorly by the calcarine sulcus.

Function 
The cuneus (Brodmann area 17) receives visual information from the same-sided superior quadrantic retina (corresponding to contralateral inferior visual field). It is most known for its involvement in basic visual processing. Pyramidal cells in the visual cortex (or striate cortex) of the cuneus, project to extrastriate cortices (BA 18,19). The mid-level visual processing that occurs in the extrastriate projection fields of the cuneus are modulated by extraretinal effects, like attention, working memory, and reward expectation.

Clinical research 
In addition to its traditional role as a site for basic visual processing, gray matter volume in the cuneus is associated with better inhibitory control in bipolar depression patients.

Pathologic gamblers have higher activity in the dorsal visual processing stream including the cuneus relative to controls.

Gallery

References

  See p. 397 for reference to "cuneus".

Gyri
Occipital lobe
Medial surface of cerebral hemisphere